Jerzy Antczak (born 25 December 1929, in Włodzimierz Wołyński) is a Polish film director. His film Nights and Days was nominated for an Academy Award for Best Foreign Language Film and was entered into the 26th Berlin International Film Festival. Jerzy Antczak was the co-founder, Artistic Director and Chief Producer of “Masterpiece Theatre” which was produced on Polish Television. He is a professor at the UCLA.

In 2009 Jerzy Antczak received a star on the prestigious Alley of the Stars in Łódź.

Selected filmography
 1968: Hrabina Cosel
 1970: Epilog norymberski
 1975: Nights and Days
 2002: Chopin: Desire for Love

References

External links
 
  Jerzy Antczak at the Culture.pl
 Jerzy Antczak at the Chopin-Desire for love
  Jerzy Antczak    at the Stowarzyszenie Filmowców Polskich 

1929 births
Living people
People from Volodymyr-Volynskyi
Polish film directors
Polish screenwriters
Łódź Film School alumni
Recipients of the Gold Medal for Merit to Culture – Gloria Artis
Recipients of the State Award Badge (Poland)